This Book Loves You is a book by the Swedish YouTuber PewDiePie, released on 20 October 2015 by Penguin Group under their Razorbill imprint. It is a parody of self-help books, and includes various anti-proverbs, paired with visuals. The book is available both as a paperback edition and an e-book.

Content 
The paperback edition contains around 250 illustrated pages with parodied inspirational quotes, and was described as being a coffee table–styled book. The book was made available in numerous languages other than English, including Swedish, French and German.

Inspiration 
PewDiePie has stated that the original idea for writing the book was given by a fan on Twitter. PewDiePie had posted a parody of an inspirational quote on social media, to which the fan reacted by restating his words with the use of funny images. In response, PewDiePie told that he wanted to do "something more with the idea", continuing with "that’s where it all began". He further stated that the book was a chance to reach his audience in a new way.

Reception 
This Book Loves You became a New York Times Bestseller and remained #1 on the list for two weeks in the Young Adult Paperback category. Common Sense Media rated the book at three stars, writing "The smart-alecky, tongue-in-cheek advice one-liners and their colorful illustrations are sure to appeal to PewDiePie's millions of followers." The book has sold over 112,000 copies as of January 2017.

References

External links 
 Publisher's official page

2015 books
Books by YouTubers
Debut books
English-language books
Parody books
PewDiePie
Swedish books
Satirical self-help books